Pudding Lane is a small street in London, widely known as the location of Thomas Farriner's bakery, where the Great Fire of London started in 1666. It runs between Eastcheap and Thames Street in the historic City of London, and intersects Monument Street, the site of Christopher Wren's Monument to the Great Fire. 

Farriner's bakery stood immediately opposite the Monument, on the eastern side of Pudding Lane. The site was paved over when Monument Street was built in 1886–87, but is marked by a plaque on the wall of nearby Farynors House, placed there by the Bakers' Company in 1986.

Pudding Lane was given its name by the butchers of Eastcheap Market, who used it to transport "pudding" or offal down to the river to be taken away by waste barges. There was a wharf at its lower end called Rothersgate (from the "rothers" or cattle that were landed there), and it was also known as Rother Lane. Another name for it was Red Rose Lane, from a shop sign that once hung in it.

Pudding Lane was one of the world's first one-way streets. An order restricting cart traffic to one-way travel on Pudding Lane and 16 other lanes around Thames Street was issued in 1617, an idea not copied until Albemarle Street became a one-way street in 1800.

The nearest Underground station to Pudding Lane is Monument, a short distance to the west. The closest main-line railway stations are Fenchurch Street and Cannon Street.

In popular culture
Tom Canty, the protagonist of Mark Twain's The Prince and the Pauper, lives on Pudding Lane.

Sara Addington was the author of some children's books referring to the lane:
The Boy Who Lived in Pudding Lane. Illustrated by Gertrude Alice Kay. Boston: Atlantic Monthly Press, 1922.
Pied Piper of Pudding Lane. Illustrated by Gertrude Alice Kay. Boston: Atlantic Monthly Press, 1923. 
Round the Year in Pudding Lane. Illustrated by Gertrude Alice Kay.  Boston: Little, Brown, and Company, 1924. 
Pudding Lane People. Illustrated by Janet Laura Scott. Boston: Little, Brown, and Company, 1926. 

Pudding Lane and Farriner's bakery feature prominently in the 2016 musical show Bumblescratch.

In the 1982 Doctor Who episode "The Visitation", aliens visit 17th century London and cause an explosion in Pudding Lane, which is revealed to be the true source of the Great Fire.

References

Bibliography
 

Streets in the City of London
History of the City of London
Great Fire of London